AlMughtaribeen University (formally shorted to MU) or Expatriate University (Arabic:جامعة المغتربين) is a private university located in Khartoum, Sudan. It was founded by Sudanese expatriates.

Foreword

At the outset, the idea of establishing MU was initiated by a group of expatriates in the Kingdom of Saudi Arabia and it was adopted by the 4th Expatriates Conference in 2000 – under the auspices of the Sudanese Expats Organization. The National Voluntary Organization for Supporting Higher Education in Sudan – situated in Riyadh, Saudi Arabia – which consists of a group of Sudanese experts and university professors – prepared a complete study aiming at the establishment of the non-profit company to start a university. The President of Sudan Marshal Omer Al-Bashir during the 5th Expatriates Conference in 2005 gave his consent and approval of the project as it meets the demands of the large sector of the Sudanese expats.

Study system
A modified credit-hour-system and the academic semester system.

Study duration
 4 years at colleges of Languages and Management.
 5 years at colleges of Medicine and  Engineering.

Study programs
1.	College of Administrative sciences: in the majors:
 Bachelor of Business administration.
 Bachelor of Accounting.
 Bachelor of Banking & Finance.
 Bachelor of Marketing.
 Bachelor of Office management.

2.	College of Engineering: B.Sc. (Honors)  in the majors:
 B.Sc. in Telecommunications engineering.
 B.Sc. in Electronics engineering (Industrial Electronics).
 B.Sc. in Electrical engineering (Control systems + Power systems).
 B.Sc. in Civil engineering.
 B.Sc. in Biomedical engineering.
 B.Sc. in Architecture.

3.	College of Languages B.A. in the majors:
 B.A. in English language.
 B.A. in Arabic language.

4.	College of Medicine:
 MB BS in Medicine.

5.	College of Pharmacy:
 BPharm in Pharmacy.

6.	College of Nursing Science:
 BSc. in Nursing Science.

7.	College of Computer Science & Information Technology:
 BSc. in Computer Science.
 BSc. in Information Technology.
 BSc. in Software Engineering.
 BSc. in Information System.

External links 

 Official Website

References

جامعة المغتربين - وزارة التعليم العالي والبحث العلمي. 
أهداف جامعة المغتربين - جهاز تنظيم شؤون السودانيين بالخارج.، University goals
وكيــل جامعـــة المغــــتربــين تهدف الجامعة لتخفيف العبء المالي وربط أبناء المغتربين بالوطن.، AlEntibaha newspaper
رسالة جامعة المغتربين. ، University message
جامعة المغتربين.. حلم يتجسد على أرض الواقع قريبًا ، AlMadina newspaper

Universities and colleges in Sudan
Educational institutions established in 2010
2010 establishments in Sudan